Rhynchomitra microrhina is a species of dictyopharid planthopper in the family Dictyopharidae.

References

Further reading

External links

 

Insects described in 1851
Dictyopharinae